The River Hebert is a small tidal river that empties into the Cumberland Basin, and is contained completely within Cumberland County, Nova Scotia. According to estimates by the Province of Nova Scotia, there were 9,092 people resident within the Maccan/Kelley/Hebert watershed in 2011.

See also
List of rivers of Nova Scotia

References

Landforms of Cumberland County, Nova Scotia
Rivers of Nova Scotia